Khilgantuy (Khilganta) is a rural locality (an ulus) in Kyakhtinsky District, Republic of Buryatia, Russia. The population was 161 as of 2010. There are 6 streets.

Geography 
Khilgantuy is located 77 km northeast of Kyakhta (the district's administrative centre) by road. Ust-Kiran is the nearest rural locality.

References 

Rural localities in Kyakhtinsky District